Saeed Ahmed Zafar is a Pakistani politician who had been a member of the National Assembly of Pakistan from 2008 to 2013.

Political career
He was elected to the National Assembly from Constituency NA-137 (Sheikhupura-VII) as an independent candidate in 2008 Pakistani general election. He received 54,732 votes and defeated Rai Mansab Ali Khan.

He ran for the seat of the National Assembly from Constituency NA-137 (Nankana Sahib-III) as an independent candidate in 2013 Pakistani general election but was unsuccessful. He received 22,967 votes and lost the seat to Rai Mansab Ali Khan.

References

Living people
Pakistani MNAs 2008–2013
Year of birth missing (living people)